Vector packs are a set or collection of vector shapes usually with the same theme like floral, wings, skulls, nature or heraldry. They are used by designers to ease the design flow and creativity also increase the speed of creating a design. Vector packs(sets) are used both by beginners and professional designers in their works. If an application supports vector packs it has its own format. Vector packs are not software or plugins that have to be independently installed; they will already be present in the application such as Adobe Illustrator.

It is not recommended to open them with Adobe Photoshop because that is a raster program: elements cannot be scaled and it will convert them to bitmap. This is only the case if the format is Illustrator format or Freehand format or EPS. 

Vector packs with CSH files can be used in Adobe Photoshop and they remain in vector format. The CSH format files can also contain a selection of same theme designs such as floral, wings, insects, dinosaurs etc. With CS6, vector pack CSH files can also be loaded as an extension into Photoshop, adding pre-built installation of the vector designs into the application.

 
Graphic design